In mathematical analysis, the Rademacher–Menchov theorem, introduced by  and , gives a sufficient condition for a series of orthogonal functions on an interval to converge almost everywhere.

Statement

If the coefficients cν of a series of bounded orthogonal functions on an interval satisfy

then the series converges almost everywhere.

References

Theorems in analysis